Ysceifiog, also written Ysgeifiog, is a small village, community and parish in Flintshire, Wales. It lies on a back road just north of the A541 highway between Nannerch and Caerwys. The name translates roughly as "a place where elder trees grow".

The parish includes the villages of Lixwm, to the east of Ysceifiog village, and Babell, to the north.

Notable residents
The antiquarian and copyist of Welsh manuscripts John Jones (c.1585-1657/8) was born and brought up in the small mansion of Gellilyfdy in Ysceifiog parish.

Thomas Wynne (1627–1692) was born in Ysceifiog, where his family dated back seventeen generations to Owain Gwynedd. Wynne became personal physician to William Penn and was one of the original settlers of Philadelphia in the Province of Pennsylvania. He also served as speaker for the first two Pennsylvania Assemblies of the Province in Philadelphia in 1687 and 1688.

The poet William Edwards (Wil Ysceifiog) also lived there in the first half of the 19th century, and John Owen (1733-1776), one of the pioneers of Methodism in Flintshire, was a native of Ysceifiog.

Today

The village pub, the Fox Inn, is a substantially unaltered 18th century building, with a front room listed on CAMRA's register of nationally important pub interiors.

The village committee maintains the local village hall which plays hosts to varying village events.

The local football team, Ysceifiog F.C., joined the Llandyrnog and District Village Summer League in 1976. It took them 31 years to win a trophy.

Although taking the name of the village Ysceifiog Wolves JFC, a successful junior league football team coming runners up in the Tesco UK Championships in 2011.

Sources
Dewi Roberts The old villages of Denbighshire and Flintshire (Gwasg Carreg Gwalch. 1999)

References

External links 

Photos of Ysceifiog and surrounding area on geograph.org.uk
Website of Ysceifiog Community Council

Villages in Flintshire
Communities in Flintshire